The Brae field is a Scottish oil field.  The name comes from a Scots language word for hillside. 
The field was discovered in 1974 by well 16/7-1 drilled by a semi-submersible rig Odin Drill for operator Pan Ocean.

The Fields are operated by TAQA Bratani and are located in UKCS block 16/7a. Three accumulations total about 70 million tonnes of oil liquids and a further 22 cubic kilometres of gas. The main platforms currently produce from underlying reserves, with regular infill drilling to identify and exploit undrained pockets in the Brae stratigraphy. A number of subsea tieback fields in the area produce through facilities on the platforms, extending their viability into the future. Gas is exported to St Fergus, Scotland via the SAGE pipeline system and oil is exported via the Forties system.

Field reservoirs 
The hydrocarbon reservoirs in the Brae field have the following properties.

Topside facilities 
The topsides for Brae Alpha (Brae South) were designed by Matthew Hall Engineering which was awarded the contract in August 1979. Initially there were facilities for 19 oil production wells, 14 water injection wells, two gas injection wells and 11 spare slots. The production capacity was 100,000 barrels of oil per day, 12,000 barrels of Natural Gas Liquids (NGL) per day and 4.25 million standard cubic metres of gas per day. There are two production trains each with three stages of separation with the first stage operating at the exceptionally high initial pressure, for that time, of 248 bar. Electricity generation was powered by four 25 MW Rolls-Royce SK-30 gas turbines. The topside accommodation was for 240 people. There were 14 topside modules and the topsides weight was 31,000 tonnes.

The topsides for Brae Bravo (Brae North) were designed by Matthew Hall Engineering which was awarded the contract in October 1983. Initially there were facilities for 12 oil production wells, three gas injection wells and 19 spare slots. The production capacity was 75,000 barrels of liquid hydrocarbons per day, and 11.3 million standard cubic metres of gas per day. There is a single production train with four stages of separation with the first stage operating at a pressure of 103. Electricity generation was powered by three 24 MW Rolls-Royce/GEC ERB-124C gas turbines. The topside accommodation was for 240 people. There were 21 topside modules and the topsides weight was 33,000 tonnes.

The topsides for East Brae were designed by Matthew Hall Engineering which was awarded the contract in October 1988. Initially there were facilities for 13 oil wells, and four gas injection wells and 13 spare slots. The production capacity was 120,000 barrels of liquid hydrocarbon per day, and 17.6 million standard cubic metres of gas per day. There is a single production train with three stages of separation with the first stage operating at a pressure of 102 bar. Electric power is provided from Brae A and Brae B by subsea cable. The topside accommodation was for 160 people. The topsides weight was 18,500 tonnes. Fabrication details are shown in the table.

See also
Energy policy of the United Kingdom
Energy use and conservation in the United Kingdom

References

External links
DECC Fields Index
DTI Brown Book 2001
Marathon Oil

BP oil and gas fields
Engie oil and gas fields
Marathon Oil
North Sea oil fields
Oil fields of Scotland